Soulful is the twelfth album by Dionne Warwick. Released in 1969 on Scepter Records, it was the first of Warwick's Scepter albums that did not directly involve her longtime production and songwriting team of Burt Bacharach and Hal David. Instead, the album was produced by Warwick and Chips Moman and was composed of covers of soul hits and soul-influenced pop songs.

History
Warwick was encouraged to make an R&B album by the surprise appearance of the B-side of her smash hit "Do You Know the Way to San Jose": "Let Me Be Lonely" on the Billboard Hot 100 chart. The gospel-tinged track reached #71 with little to no promotion .

Soulful was recorded at Moman's American Studios in Memphis, Tennessee; Warwick was backed by the studio houseband comprising Gene Chrisman (drums), Tommy Cogbill (bass), Bobby Emmons (keyboards) and Reggie Young (guitar).  Thirteen tracks were recorded: Warwick's renditions of "The Weight", "Loving You Is Sweeter Than Ever" and "The Love of My Man" were not included on the album.

The track "You've Lost That Lovin' Feeling" was the only single released from the album in the U.S. and a success at #16 on the Billboard Hot 100 Singles Chart(#13 R&B).  In the UK, Dionne had a minor hit with "People Got To Be Free" written by Rascals Felix Cavaliere & Eddie Brigati.  With a #11 peak on the Billboard Hot 200 album chart, Soulful was one of Warwick's most successful albums in the 1960s, due in part to its promotion via full-page newspaper ads placed by Warwick herself.

In 1972, Scepter released From Within which included all thirteen tracks from the Soulful sessions as well as thirteen obscure R&B influenced tracks by Warwick. Issued as Warwick was ending her tenure with Scepter, From Within reached #169; the tracks "The Love of My Man" and "I'm Your Puppet" were issued as singles respectively bubbling under the Hot 100 at #107 and #113.

In January 2004, Rhino Handmade issued the limited edition (5000 copies) Soulful Plus an internet-only purchase disc comprising the thirteen tracks from the Soulful sessions plus nine obscure R&B influenced tracks by Warwick and a previously unreleased version of "Put a Little Love in Your Heart".

Track listing

Personnel
Dionne Warwick - vocals
Reggie Young - guitar
Tommy Cogbill - bass
Bobby Emmons - piano
Gene Chrisman - drums
Mike Leech - string arrangements

References

External links
Soulful at Discogs

Dionne Warwick albums
1969 albums
Albums produced by Chips Moman
Scepter Records albums